The National First XV Championship (or the Top 4) is the Premier Rugby Union competition for Secondary Schools/Colleges in New Zealand. Since 2016, the Top 4 tournament has been based at the Massey University Sport and Rugby Institute in Palmerston North. The New Zealand Schools' and New Zealand Barbarians Schools' teams are generally announced at the conclusion of the tournament, whereby a development camp will take place the following week at the Institute. 

The winning school of the Top 4 tournament is awarded the National Championship title and recognised as the top NZ 1st XV school in the nation. Additionally, they are nominated as the representative team for New Zealand at the SANIX World Rugby Tournament. If the scores are tied at fulltime, the title is shared and the SANIX nomination is decided as-per the semi-final tiebreaker process.

Qualification
The National First XV Championship is ultimately broken down via the Top 4, which is made up of the winners of the four regions: Blues, Chiefs, Hurricanes and South Island. The Top 4 was established in 1982 as an invitational tournament, whereby invitations were extended to 1st XV high school teams based on their form throughout the previous season. This was the system used during the '80s. The format of the qualifying process subsequently changed multiple times since then, until it settled on its current format.

Each region operates its own different qualification system:

Blues: 
The Northland and North Harbour champions meet, with the winner of that match facing the Auckland 1A Competition champion in the Blues Cup final. The winner of this final represents the Blues region in the National Top 4 Tournament. 

Chiefs: 
Each province within the Chiefs region determines their own winner, followed by a knockout bracket. The knockout bracket incorporates multiple competitions, with the best ranked team from the Chiefs region in the Super 8 competition (either Hamilton Boys' High School, Rotorua Boys' High School, Tauranga Boys' College or New Plymouth Boys' High School) and in the Central North Island 1st XV competition playing each other. The winner of this match advances to the Chiefs semi-final, joined by the winner of a Chiefs playoff match (between the next two best ranked Super 8 Chiefs-region teams), a New Plymouth representative and a Waikato/Counties Manukau representative. The winner of each respective semi-final faces off in the Chiefs Cup Final. The winner of the final represents the Chiefs region in the National Top 4 Tournament.  

Hurricanes:  
The winner and runner-up of the Wellington Premiership and the top-two region schools that play in the Super 8 competition (either Gisborne Boys' High School, Napier Boys' High School, Hastings Boys' High School or Palmerston North Boys' High School) play in a seeded semi-final. A 'challenger' place is available to any region school, including schools that do not play in either competition, with that match taking place prior to the seeded semi-final matches. The winners of the semi-finals face off in the Hurricanes Cup final, with the winner representing the Hurricanes region in the National Top 4 tournament.

South Island: 
The Crusaders Cup winner is the top side from the region-wide Miles Toyota Championship. Since the Highlanders-region competition was discontinued after 2015, a provincial-based knockout format has been used. The winner of the Otago Premier School competition may face a Waitaki representative, with the winner of that match facing a Southland representative in the Highlanders Cup final. Whoever triumphs in that final wins the Highlanders Cup and progresses to the South Island final. The winner of the match between the Crusaders Cup winner and the Highlanders Cup winner represents the South Island at the National Top 4 tournament. 

Top 4 Tournament

The four regional-franchise winning teams then play two semi-finals, at the Top 4 tournament based in one place each year. The winners advance to the National 1st XV Final. The semifinal matchups change each year; for example, the Blues winner plays the Hurricanes winner one year, the Chiefs winner the next, and finally the South Island winner in rotation. This format doesn't necessarily pit the four strongest Highschool 1st XV's against each other, as there's no guarantee that the four strongest teams are spread out amongst all of the four regions. However, it does allow a fair representation of teams from each respective region, while still maintaining a high standard courtesy of the qualifying system.

There is also the possibility to obtain the Moascar Cup during the tournament, as the holder of the cup must put it up for challenge if they are present at the Top 4.

Some titles have been shared. Some feel there is an overwhelming need to include an extra time period to determine an outright winner. This is currently not allowed for under World Rugby's Under-19 variations. In the event of a drawn semi-final, the team that advances is determined by a hierarchy of factors, starting with which team scored the most tries in the match.

List of results

Top 4 results table

Below is a list of historical Top 4 results, with their New Zealand Super Rugby regions in brackets. 
Where scores are tied at full-time (70min), the title is shared between both schools, as no extra time is played in 1st XV matches. Third/fourth playoff matches were not played from 2002-2004 and from 2012-2014. This is denoted by a dash in place of the score on the table. The losing semi-finalists from those years are treated as third-equal, as is the case with a drawn result.

The tournament was cancelled for the first time in 2020, as a result of the delay of the Rugby season, due to the COVID-19 pandemic. This allowed teams to prioritise their local competitions.

Summary table
Below is a summary table of the results of each school that has appeared in the Top 4. The most successful school and most Top 4 appearances are Hamilton Boys' High School of the Chiefs region, with 13 appearances and 5 titles. All of those appearances have come since 2004, within a 19-year span. Also Wesley College of the Chiefs region with 5 titles and 7 finals appearances, followed by Kelston Boys' High School of the Blues region, also with 5 titles - all of them title-winning showings. This is followed by Napier Boys' High School of the Hurricanes region and Otago Boys' High School of the Highlanders, South Island region, both with 11 Top 4 appearances apiece. The school with the most consecutive title wins is Christchurch Boys' High School of the Crusaders, South Island region - three, from 2004-2006. Two other schools have successfully defended their titles, on three separate occasions; Hamilton Boys' High School (2008-2009 and 2013-2014) and Kelston Boys' High School of the Blues region (1995-1996).

Summary table by region
Below is a summary table of Top 4 results sorted by the representative Super Rugby regions. Due to the tournament previously being invitational, the number of appearances by Blues, Chiefs, Hurricanes and South Island representations are not equal - some years multiple teams from one region were present, whilst in other years, no teams from a particular region were present. The region that has produced the most title wins is the Blues with 16 titles from 28 appearances, closely followed by the Chiefs region with 15 titles from 36 Top 4 appearances. The Hurricanes region has produced the most finals appearances, having schools from the Hurricanes region present 45 times in the Top 4, in the 38 editions since its inception.

Results by local competition

Below is a summary table of Top 4 results sorted by the representative local competition. Due to some local competitions containing schools from multiple Super Rugby regions, some years multiple teams from one competition were present. The competition that has produced the most title wins is the Auckland 1A 1st XV competition, with 16 titles from 28 appearances, closely followed by the Super 8 1st XV competition with 14 titles from 49 Top 4 appearances. The Super 8 1st XV comp has produced the most finals appearances, having schools from the competition present 49 times in the Top 4, in the 38 editions since its inception.
In 2002, Napier Boys' High School (Hurricanes) and Rotorua Boys' High School (Chiefs) drew the Top 4 final and their title was shared. In both 2004 and 2012 the playoff match for third was not held, and the teams from these years (Napier Boys' High School (Hurricanes) and Hamilton Boys' High School (Chiefs) in 2004, and Hamilton Boys' High School and Hastings Boys' High School (Hurricanes) in 2012) shared 3rd. All of these schools from these instances belong to the Super 8 1st XV competition and as such, these years are listed twice to represent the results of each school.

Semifinal results table

Below is a list of historical Top 4 semifinal results, with their New Zealand Super Rugby regions in brackets. 

In the event of a drawn semi-final at full-time (70min), the team that advances is determined by a number of different factors, as no extra time is played in 1st XV matches. The hierarchy of factors starts with which team scored the most tries in the match, followed by which team scored the first try in the match. If no tries have been scored in the match, the winner is decided by which team scored the first points in the match. Lastly, if the score is 0-0 at fulltime, the team that progresses is decided by the flip of a coin.

Third/fourth playoff matches were not played from 2002-2004 and from 2012-2014. The losing semi-finalists from those years are treated as third-equal, as is the case with a drawn result in a normal 3rd/4th playoff match.

Moascar Cup
The oldest and most prestigious nationwide trophy in 1st XV rugby dates back to the end of World War One. At the end of the Great War, ten divisions of troops, six British, three Australian and a New Zealand division were waiting in Ismailia, Egypt to be sent home. Authorities within these divisions decided competitive sport would be a good way to fill in the time. A committee of officers was formed and they visited Cairo in search of a suitable trophy for a rugby tournament. When they returned they had a magnificent but somewhat cumbersome trophy made of Sterling Silver and stamped with "Made in London, 1904". The trophy was named the Moascar Cup. (Moascar was thought to be the name of a village in Egypt but it is, in fact, Arabic for "camp".) It was decided that the trophy in honour of the occasion should be mounted on the centre part of a sawn-off German propeller shot down in Palestine. The Cup, also contested by a South African division, was won by the New Zealand Mounted Rifle Brigade who won eight and drew one of its nine games.

On return to New Zealand, there was considerable debate about what was the best use for the trophy. It was agreed that it should be returned to the New Zealand Rugby Union and used for an appropriate competition. The individual charged with convincing the New Zealand Rugby Union of the trophy’s merit was Lieutenant-Colonel E J Hublert, commanding officer of the Mounted Rifle Brigade. The trophy was accepted and the New Zealand Rugby Union decided the best use for the trophy was to use it to promote Secondary Schools rugby which had suffered badly because of the War. A knockout competition in both the North and South Islands was inaugurated with the final to be played at Athletic Park in Wellington. However, the best intentions of administrators were undone by apathetic attitudes by some schools and three years of expensive and time-consuming matches. Soon the knockout competition was abolished and replaced by a challenge system.

The current rules state that holders must nominate matches in which other schools can compete for it. A total of 7 matches must be announced once the cup is in contention. There used to be a tendency where holders would withhold putting the cup up for grabs against stronger opposition while making it available against perceived lesser sides. Doing so reduced the risk of losing the cup. There have been calls for the cup to be put up more regularly such is the demand and prestige of it. Many have voiced that the cup be put up at all home games and all knockout fixtures.

Another call to change has been regarding a tied score at full time. Like the National Top 4, no extra time is applied. The Moascar Cup defender continues to hold the cup if the scores are tied at full time.

Super 8 and Quadrangular Tournament
There are two other major tournaments that are contested. Neither hold effect on qualification to the National Top 4. However, the Moascar Cup may be put up for contention during participation in the tournaments.

Formed in 1997, the New Zealand Super Eight group of schools incorporates the 8 boys' high schools from their respective provincial cities of the central North Island and is played in place of respective local competitions. The first sporting competitions were sponsored by Canterbury International and commenced in 1998, involving rugby and cricket. Since that time, the Super Eight concept has grown to include not only 10 sports competitions, but also a cultural festival and professional development programmes for management staff and curriculum teachers. For rugby, many argue that the Super 8 is on par with the Auckland 1A competition where both are the toughest pre-Top 4 round-robin competitions in New Zealand secondary school rugby. The Super 8 is contested between, Gisborne Boys' High School, Hamilton Boys' High School, Rotorua Boys' High School, Tauranga Boys' College, Napier Boys' High School, Hastings Boys' High School, New Plymouth Boys' High School and Palmerston North Boys' High School.

The Quadrangular Tournament is the oldest secondary school rugby tournament which is competed between Wanganui Collegiate, Wellington College, Nelson College and Christ's College. It was initially known as the Triangular Tournament from 1890 to 1924 till Nelson College joined in 1925. In 2012 the 85th Quadrangular Tournament was contested. Regardless of being oldest tournament in New Zealand secondary school rugby, it does not receive the same recognition as the National Top 4, Auckland 1A or Super 8 as no school that competes in it has ever gone on to win a National Championship (with the exception of Nelson College that won the Moascar Cup in 2016).

References

High school rugby union
New Zealand rugby union competitions